Elsie is a village in Clinton County in the U.S. state  of Michigan.  The population was 966 at the 2010 census.  The village consists of two noncontiguous portions within Duplain Township in the northeast portion of Clinton County—the smaller of which contains the village's Riverside Cemetery.

History
Elsie was founded in 1857 and platted the same year.  It was incorporated in 1885. Elsie is named for Miss Elsie Tillotson, the daughter of an early settler.

Geography

Demographics

2010 census
As of the census of 2010, there were 966 people, 392 households, and 256 families living in the village. The racial makeup of the village was 97.3% White, 0.4% African American, 0.6% Native American, 0.1% Asian, 0.9% from other races, and 0.6% from two or more races. Hispanic or Latino of any race were 2.4% of the population.

There were 392 households, of which 35.5% had children under the age of 18 living with them, 52.0% were married couples living together, 11.0% had a female householder with no husband present, 2.3% had a male householder with no wife present, and 34.7% were non-families. 28.8% of all households were made up of individuals, and 13.1% had someone living alone who was 65 years of age or older. The average household size was 2.45 and the average family size was 3.01.

The median age in the village was 39.7 years. 25.5% of residents were under the age of 18; 7.9% were between the ages of 18 and 24; 24.3% were from 25 to 44; 26% were from 45 to 64; and 16.3% were 65 years of age or older. The gender makeup of the village was 48.7% male and 51.3% female.

2000 census
As of the census of 2000, there were 1,055 people, 414 households, and 288 families living in the village. The racial makeup of the village was 97.82% White, 0.09% African American, 0.19% Native American, 0.09% Asian, 1.42% from other races, and 0.38% from two or more races. Hispanic or Latino of any race were 2.37% of the population.

There were 414 households, out of which 32.6% had children under the age of 18 living with them, 55.3% were married couples living together, 11.1% had a female householder with no husband present, and 30.4% were non-families. 26.6% of all households were made up of individuals, and 16.4% had someone living alone who was 65 years of age or older.  The average household size was 2.53 and the average family size was 3.05.

In the village, the population was spread out, with 26.7% under the age of 18, 7.1% from 18 to 24, 26.1% from 25 to 44, 21.9% from 45 to 64, and 18.2% who were 65 years of age or older.  The median age was 38 years. For every 100 females, there were 85.4 males.  For every 100 females age 18 and over, there were 81.9 males.

The median income for a household in the village was $36,635, and the median income for a family was $43,182. Males had a median income of $35,875 versus $24,375 for females. The per capita income for the village was $15,809.  About 8.0% of families and 11.6% of the population were below the poverty line, including 19.3% of those under age 18 and 9.5% of those age 65 or over.

References

External links
Official website of the Village of Elsie

Villages in Clinton County, Michigan
Villages in Michigan
Lansing–East Lansing metropolitan area
1885 establishments in Michigan
Populated places established in 1885